The following highways are numbered 36:

International
 European route E36

Australia
 City Road, Sydney
 Domain Highway, Tasmania
 Arnhem Highway

Canada
Alberta Highway 36
 Ontario Highway 36
 Saskatchewan Highway 36

China 
  G36 Expressway

Costa Rica
 National Route 36

Czech Republic
 I/36 Highway; Czech: Silnice I/36

France
A36 autoroute

Iceland
Route 36 (Iceland)

India
  National Highway 36 (India)

Iran
 Road 36

Italy
 Autostrada A36
 State road 36

Japan
 Japan National Route 36

New Zealand
 New Zealand State Highway 36

Korea, South
 National Route 36

United Kingdom
 British A36 (Bath-Southampton)

United States
 Interstate 36 (former proposal)
 U.S. Route 36
 Alabama State Route 36
 Arkansas Highway 36
 California State Route 36
 County Route J36 (California)
 Colorado State Highway 36
 Delaware Route 36
 Florida State Road 36 (pre-1945) (former)
 Georgia State Route 36
 Georgia State Route 36 (1919–1941) (former)
 Hawaii Route 36
 Hawaii Route 36A
 Idaho State Highway 36
 Illinois Route 36 (former)
 Iowa Highway 36 (former)
 County Road E36 (Linn County, Iowa)
 County Road W36 (Linn County, Iowa)
 Kentucky Route 36
 Louisiana Highway 36
 Maryland Route 36
 Massachusetts Route 36
 M-36 (Michigan highway)
 Minnesota State Highway 36
 County Road 36 (Chisago County, Minnesota)
 County Road 36 (Hennepin County, Minnesota)
 County Road 36 (Ramsey County, Minnesota)
 Missouri Route 36 (1922) (former)
 Nebraska Highway 36
 Nevada State Route 36 (former)
 New Jersey Route 36
 County Route 36 (Bergen County, New Jersey)
 County Route 36 (Monmouth County, New Jersey)
 New Mexico State Road 36
 New York State Route 36
 New York State Route 36A (former)
 County Route 36 (Allegany County, New York)
 County Route 36 (Chautauqua County, New York)
 County Route 36 (Chemung County, New York)
 County Route 36 (Dutchess County, New York)
 County Route 36 (Genesee County, New York)
 County Route 36 (Greene County, New York)
 County Route 36 (Jefferson County, New York)
 County Route 36 (Livingston County, New York)
 County Route 36A (Livingston County, New York)
 County Route 36 (Montgomery County, New York)
 County Route 36 (Niagara County, New York)
 County Route 36 (Ontario County, New York)
 County Route 36 (Orange County, New York)
 County Route 36 (Putnam County, New York)
 County Route 36 (Rensselaer County, New York)
 County Route 36 (Rockland County, New York)
 County Route 36 (Saratoga County, New York)
 County Route 36 (Schenectady County, New York)
 County Route 36 (Steuben County, New York)
 County Route 36 (Suffolk County, New York)
 North Carolina Highway 36 (former)
 North Dakota Highway 36
 Ohio State Route 36 (1923) (former)
 Oklahoma State Highway 36
 Oklahoma State Highway 36A (former)
 Oregon Route 36
 Pennsylvania Route 36
 South Carolina Highway 36 (former)
 South Dakota Highway 36
 Tennessee State Route 36
 Texas State Highway 36
 Texas State Highway Loop 36
 Farm to Market Road 36
 Texas Park Road 36
 Utah State Route 36
 Vermont Route 36
 Virginia State Route 36
 Virginia State Route 36 (1923-1933) (former)
 West Virginia Route 36
 Wisconsin Highway 36
 Wyoming Highway 36

Territories
 Puerto Rico Highway 36

See also
A36 (disambiguation)#Roads